Papilio astyalus, the broad-banded swallowtail or Astyalus swallowtail, is a butterfly of the family Papilionidae. It is found from Mexico south to Argentina. It is occasionally reported from southern Texas and rare strays can be found up to southern Arizona and northern Texas.

The wingspan is 117–120 mm. Adults are on wing from April to October. There are probably two generations per year.

The larvae feed on the leaves of Citrus trees. Adults feed on the nectar of various flowers, including Lantana species.

Subspecies
P. a. astyalus (Brazil (Rio Grande do Sul, São Paulo, Minas Gerais, Parana), Argentina, Paraguay)
P. a. pallas Gray, [1853] (Texas, Mexico, Costa Rica)
P. a. bajaensis Brown & Faulkner, 1992 (Mexico (Baja California Sur))
P. a. hippomedon (C. & R. Felder, 1859) (Colombia, Venezuela)
P. a. phanias Rothschild & Jordan, 1906 (Ecuador, Peru, Bolivia, Goias)
P. a. anchicayaensis Constantino, Le Crom & Salazar, 2002 (Colombia)

Biogeographic realm
Neotropical realm.

References

Lewis, H. L., 1974 Butterflies of the World  Page 25, figure 6

External links

nearctica.com
Butterflycorner Images from Naturhistorisches Museum Wien

astyalus
Butterflies of North America
Papilionidae of South America
Butterflies described in 1819